Darou Pakhsh Holding Company (Shirkæt-e Karxanujat-e Darvipaxesh, lit. drug distribution company)  is a major pharmaceutical company in Iran. The company is majority-owned by the Social Security Organization of Iran. The company manufactures, distributes, imports and exports finished products and pharmaceutical raw materials. Darou Pakhsh has an annual turnover of US$400m and claims to have the largest research and development operation of any Iranian drug firm. The company formed a plasmapheresis joint venture with a German medical firm, Biotest AG, in early 2004. Darou Pakhsh is listed on the Tehran Stock Exchange.

History
Initially, the plant had been designed to produce 20 dosage forms. During over 40 years of activity in pharmaceutical industry, the company has been employing many qualified pharmacists, expert chemists, & skilled technicians. Also, modern machinery installation, equipping the laboratory with new analytical instruments, taking advantage of facilities along with decades of gaining scientific knowledge has brought the company up-to-date in all its sections which conform to the latest standards

See also
Pharmaceutical industry in Iran

References

External links
 
 

Pharmaceutical companies of Iran
Companies listed on the Tehran Stock Exchange
Pharmaceutical companies established in 1956
Iranian brands
Iranian companies established in 1956